is a Fukui Railway Fukubu Line railway station located in the city of Fukui, Fukui Prefecture, Japan.

Lines

Station layout
The station consists of one ground-level side platform serving a single bi-directional track. The station is unattended.

Adjacent stations

History
The station opened on March 20, 2011.

Surrounding area
 Taichō-ji
 Fukui Prefectural Road 181
 Fukui Prefectural Road 229
 Fukui Asōzu Elementary School

See also
 List of railway stations in Japan

External links
  

Railway stations in Fukui Prefecture
Railway stations in Japan opened in 2011
Fukui Railway Fukubu Line
Fukui (city)